He Shihua (born 26 September 1985) is a Chinese businessman and footballer who plays as a forward for Zibo Cuju.

Career
He invested in Chinese fourth division side Sichuan Minzu.

Before the 2021 season, He became chairman of Zibo Cuju in the Chinese second division.

Career statistics

References

External links
 

Living people
1985 births
Chinese footballers
Association football forwards
China League One players
Zibo Cuju F.C. players
21st-century Chinese people